"Lover Lover" is a song by Australian rock musician, Jimmy Barnes. Released in September 1996 as the lead single from his Barnes Hits Anthology (1996). The song was written by his wife, Jane. The song peaked at number 6 on the Australian ARIA Singles Chart.

Track listing
 CD Single
 "Lover Lover" - 3:31

Charts

Weekly charts

Year-end charts

References

Mushroom Records singles
1996 singles
1996 songs
Jimmy Barnes songs
Songs written by Jimmy Barnes